The Inspector of the Army ( or InspH) is the title held by the commander and highest ranking officer of the German Army (unless the Inspector General is an army officer) of the modern-day German Armed Forces or Bundeswehr. The Inspector is the most senior officer to serve in the German Army and is a military adviser to the Government of Germany as well as the Ministry of Defence.

He is responsible for the readiness of personnel and materiel in the German Army, in that regard he reports directly to the Inspector General of the Bundeswehr (and before 2012, directly to the Federal Minister of Defence). The Inspector commands the Army Command with its subordinate divisions (and division equivalents) and the Army Office with its subordinate training and support establishments. He is a member of the Defence Council for Bundeswehr-wide matters.

The Inspector and his deputy both hold the rank of lieutenant general (Generalleutnant).

The incumbent Inspector .

List of Inspectors
The Inspectors of the Army, since 1956.

Notes

References

External links 
 The Inspectors of the German Army from 1956 to present
 Official curriculum vitae of the current Inspector

Bundeswehr
German Army (1956–present)
Germany